Falcicula is a genus of winged bush crickets, or trigs, in the family Gryllidae, containing the single species Falcicula hebardi.

Common names for Falcicula hebardi are "Hebard's trig" and "Hebard's bush cricket". It is found in North America.

References

Further reading

External links

 

Crickets
Trigonidiidae